The discography of Australian R&B and pop music recording artist Marcia Hines consists of fourteen studio albums, one live album, nine compilation album and forty-one singles.

Studio albums

Compilation albums

Live albums

Singles 

"—" denotes releases that did not chart, or have no reliable sources of charting information.

 a "I'm Coming Out" peaked at number 41 in Australian Club singles chart.

Other appearances

References

Discographies of Australian artists
Rhythm and blues discographies
Pop music discographies